Krio Dayak may refer to:
the Krio Dayak people
the Krio Dayak language